Raka Bhattacharya is a popular Indian playback singer from Kolkata, West Bengal. She primarily sings Bengali songs.

She shot to fame in 2016, with her first single release, 'Brishti Pagol'. Brishti Pagol was a love song that she sung as a duet , with legendary Bengali musician Kabir Suman. The song was composed by Anindya Bhattacharya while Kabir Suman and poet Joyasish Ghosh penned down the lyrics. The song, initially released through YouTube, was well appreciated by the Bengali listeners.

Bhattacharya debuted as a playback singer in the Chiranjeet Chakraborty starred romantic drama Guhamanob (2017), directed by Paromita Munsi. The soundtrack of the film included two songs by Raka, one a solo rendition of Rabindranath Tagore's Sesh Ganeri Resh and Shedin Dujone, another Rabindrasangeet that she sung with Kabir Suman. Kabir Suman scored the music for the film. The movie received mixed reviews from critics, but the Soundtrack was uniformly appreciated.

References

Singers from Kolkata
Living people
Bengali playback singers
Indian women playback singers
1985 births